The western gorilla (Gorilla gorilla) is a great ape found in Africa, one of two species of the hominid genus Gorilla. Two subspecies are recognised, Gorilla gorilla diehli (Cross River gorilla) is limited to a smaller range in the north at the border of Cameroon and Nigeria. Both subspecies are listed Critically Endangered.

Taxonomy
A formal description of the species was provided by Thomas Savage in 1847, allying the new species to an earlier description of the chimpanzee as Troglodytes gorilla in a group of eastern simians he referred to as "orangs". The author selected the specific epithet for the name given by Hanno to "wild men" he had noted on the east coast of Africa, presumed by Savage to be a species of orang. The population is recognised as two subspecies:

Nearly all of the individuals of this taxon belong to the western lowland gorilla subspecies, whose population is approximately 95,000 individuals. Only 250 to 300 of the only other western gorilla subspecies, the Cross river gorilla, are thought to remain.

Description

Western lowland gorillas are generally lighter colored than eastern gorillas. Western lowland gorillas have black, dark grey or dark brown-grey hair with a brownish forehead. The Cross River gorilla differs from the western lowland gorilla in both skull and tooth dimensions.

Behavior and ecology
Western lowland gorillas live in groups that vary in size from two to twenty individuals. Such groups are composed of at least one male, several females and their offspring. A dominant male silverback heads the group, with younger males usually leaving the group when they reach maturity. Females transfer to another group before breeding, which begins at eight to nine years old; they care for their young infants for the first three to four years of their lives. The interval between births, therefore, is long, which partly explains the slow population growth rates that make the western lowland gorilla so vulnerable to poaching. Due to the long gestation time, long period of parental care, and infant mortality, a female gorilla will only give birth to an offspring that survives to maturity every six to eight years. Western lowland gorillas are long-lived and may survive for as long as 40 years in the wild. Wild western lowland gorillas are known to use tools.

Western lowland gorillas' diets are high in fiber, including leaves, stems, fruit, piths, flowers, bark, invertebrates, and soil. The frequency of when each of these are consumed depends on the particular western lowland gorilla group and the season. Furthermore, different groups of western lowland gorillas eat differing numbers and species of plants and invertebrates, suggesting they have a food culture. Fruit comprises most of the western lowland gorillas' diets when it is abundant, directly influencing their foraging and ranging patterns. There is a correlation between the amount of time a western lowland gorilla travels and the season in which fruits are available. The western lowland gorillas spend more time traveling and feeding during the seasons when fruits are abundant compared to when there is less fruits available. Fruits of the genera Tetrapleura, Chrysophyllum, Dialium, and Landolphia are favored by the western lowland gorillas. Low-quality herbs, such as leaves and woody vegetation, are only eaten when fruit is scarce. In the dry season from January to March, when fleshy fruits are few and far between, more fibrous vegetation such as the leaves and bark of the low-quality herbs Palisota and Aframomum are consumed. Of the invertebrates consumed by the western lowland gorillas, termites and ants make up the majority. Caterpillars, grubs, and larvae are also consumed in rarity.

Some ethnographic and pharmacological studies have suggested a possible medicinal value in particular foods consumed by the western lowland gorilla. The fruit and seeds of multiple Cola species are consumed. Given the low protein content, the main reason for their consumption may be the stimulating effect of the caffeine in them. Western lowland gorillas inhabiting Gabon have been observed consuming the fruit, stems, and roots of Tabernanthe iboga, which, due to the compound ibogaine in it, acts on the central nervous system, producing hallucinogenic effects. It also has effects comparable to caffeine. There is also evidence for medicinal value for the seed pods of Aframomum melegueta in western lowland gorillas' diets, which seem to have some sort of cardiovascular health benefit for western lowland gorillas, and are a known part of the natural diets for many wild populations.

A study published in 2007 announced the discovery of this species fighting back against possible threats from humans. They "found several instances of gorillas throwing sticks and clumps of grass". This is unusual, because western lowland gorillas usually flee and rarely charge when they encounter humans.

One mirror test in Gabon shows that western lowland gorilla silverbacks react aggressively when faced with a mirror, although refusing to look fully at their reflection.

Conservation status
The World Conservation Union lists the western gorilla as critically endangered, the most severe denomination next to global extinction, on its 2007 Red List of Threatened Species. The Ebola virus might be depleting western gorilla populations to a point where their recovery might become impossible, and the virus reduced populations in protected areas by 33% from 1992 to 2007, which may be equal to a decline of 45% for a period of just 20 years spanning 1992 to 2011. Poaching, commercial logging and civil wars in the countries that compose the western gorillas' habitat are also threats. Furthermore, reproductive rates are very low, with a maximum intrinsic rate of increase of about 3% and the high levels of decline from hunting and disease-induced mortality have caused declines in population of more than 60% over the last 20 to 25 years. Rather, under the optimistic estimate scenarios, population recovery would require almost 75 years. Yet within the next thirty years, habitat loss and degradation from agriculture, timber extraction, mining and climate change will become increasingly larger threats. Thus, a population reduction of more than 80% over three generations (i.e., 66 years from 1980 to 2046) seems likely. In the 1980s, a census taken of the gorilla populations in equatorial Africa was thought to be 100,000. Researchers adjusted the figure in 2008 after years of poaching and deforestation had reduced the population to approximately 50,000.

Surveys conducted by the Wildlife Conservation Society in 2006 and 2007 found around 125,000 previously unreported gorillas have been living in the swamp forests of Lake Tele Community Reserve and in neighbouring Marantaceae (dryland) forests in the Republic of the Congo. This discovery could more than double the known population of the animals, though the effect that the discovery will have on the gorillas' conservation status is currently unknown. With the new discovery, the current population of western lowland gorillas could be around 150,000–200,000. However, the gorilla remains vulnerable to Ebola, deforestation, and poaching.

Estimates on the number of Cross River gorillas remaining is 250–300 in the wild, concentrated in approximately 9-11 locations. Recent genetic research and field surveys suggest that there is occasional migration of individual gorillas between locations. Both loss of habitat and intense hunting for bushmeat have contributed to the decline of this subspecies. In 2007, a conservation plan for the Cross River gorilla was published, outlining the most important actions necessary to preserve this subspecies. The government of Cameroon has created the Takamanda National Park on the border with Nigeria, as an attempt to protect these gorillas. The park now forms part of an important trans-boundary protected area with Nigeria's Cross River National Park, safeguarding an estimated 115 gorillas—a third of the Cross River gorilla population—along with other rare species. The hope is that these gorillas will be able to move between the Takamanda reserve in Cameroon over the border to Nigeria's Cross River National Park.

Individuals
The names of individuals of the species includes:
 Jambo
 Koko
 Harambe
 Willie B.
 Snowflake
 Colo
 Timmy
 Pattycake
 Bokito

References

External links

Western gorilla – silverbackgorillatours.com

western gorilla
EDGE species
Critically endangered fauna of Africa
western gorilla
Mammals of Gabon
Mammals of Cameroon
Mammals of the Democratic Republic of the Congo
Mammals of the Republic of the Congo
Fauna of Nigeria
Fauna of Central Africa
Taxa named by Thomas S. Savage